Alexander Hart Greenwich (born 28 November 1980) is the member of the New South Wales Legislative Assembly, representing the seat of Sydney since the 2012 Sydney by-election. He ran as an independent and was backed by his predecessor, independent Clover Moore. He is also the Co-Chair of Australian Marriage Equality and was one of the key leaders of the successful Yes campaign for the Australian Marriage Law Postal Survey in 2017 and abortion legalisation within New South Wales in 2019.

Early years and background
Greenwich was born in New Zealand to a Georgian father and American mother. His father, Victor Greenwich Dadianov (formerly the Honorary Consul-General of Georgia in Sydney, 2004–2013), was born Prince Victor Dadianov of the princely Georgian Dadiani family but his mother changed the name to Greenwich after they moved as refugees to New Zealand from Russia after the Second World War. At the age of seven, Greenwich moved with his family to Sydney, Australia. From his family residence in Circular Quay, Greenwich was educated at Sydney Grammar School and completed a Bachelor of Arts in Human Resource Management and Russian Studies at the University of New South Wales. From 1 December 1998 to 1 December 2012, Greenwich was the Managing Director of his own recruiting agency, Winning Attitudes Recruitment.

Personal life

Greenwich is the only openly gay male MP in the NSW Legislative Assembly. Before entering politics, Greenwich was a prominent LGBT rights activist and led Australian Marriage Equality.

Prior to running for office, Greenwich was from 2009 the national convener of Australian Marriage Equality and was named as one of Samesame.com.au's 25 most influential gay and lesbian Australians in 2010. As national convener, Greenwich organised over 44,000 submissions to be made to the 2011 senate inquiry into same-sex marriage, and continues to be a prominent activist for achieving same-sex marriage reform in Australia. In May 2012, Greenwich married his German long-term partner, Victor Hoeld in Argentina, where same-sex marriage was already legal.

Political career

In July 2012, Greenwich aligned himself with prominent independent Lord Mayor of Sydney Clover Moore and announced his candidacy on Moore's ticket for the Sydney City Council elections scheduled for the NSW local government elections in September 2012. This low (and therefore most likely unelectable) position on the ticket fuelled speculation that this was to increase Greenwich's visibility for a possible run to succeed Moore should she be forced to resign her state seat of Sydney in light of promised reforms by the O'Farrell Liberal/National government to ban MPs from serving on local government bodies.

Greenwich subsequently contested the 2012 Sydney by-election as an independent with the endorsement of Moore, comfortably defeating Shayne Mallard of the Liberal Party with a 47.3 percent primary and 63.7 percent two-candidate preferred vote. Greenwich said after the by-election that it was "very clear Barry O'Farrell's legislation has backfired – because now there are two of us". Greenwich has denied claims that he is a single-issue politician, having gone to the by-election on a platform involving a range of policy areas, including small business, the re-establishment of an inner-city public high school, and social welfare and public housing, among others.

Greenwich introduced the Reproductive Health Care Reform Bill 2019 into the New South Wales Legislative Assembly on 1 August 2019, in a bid to decriminalise abortion in New South Wales, allow abortions for up to 22 weeks, and permit an abortion after 22 weeks if two medical practitioners agree. The bill passed the parliament on 26 September and was assented on 2 October 2019 as the Abortion Law Reform Act 2019.

References

External links
Alex Greenwich – Independent for Sydney

1980 births
Living people
Australian people of American descent
Australian people of Georgian descent
Australian people of Russian descent
Gay politicians
Independent members of the Parliament of New South Wales
Australian LGBT rights activists
LGBT legislators in Australia
Members of the New South Wales Legislative Assembly
New Zealand emigrants to Australia
People educated at Sydney Grammar School
Politicians from Sydney
University of New South Wales alumni
House of Dadiani
21st-century Australian politicians
21st-century LGBT people
New Zealand people of American descent